Money Creek is a stream in Houston and Winona counties, in the U.S. state of Minnesota. It is a tributary of the Root River.  Money Creek was so named when a passerby's money blew into the creek and was lost.

Habitat
According to the Minnesota Department of Natural Resources, species present in Money Creek include Brown trout, white sucker, longnose dace, blacknose dace, central stoneroller, creek chub, hornyhead chub, bluntnose minnow, fathead minnow, suckermouth minnow, common shiner, sand shiner, bigmouth shiner, spotfin shiner, logperch, black bullhead, brook stickleback, Johnny darter and fantail darter.

See also
List of rivers of Minnesota

References

Rivers of Houston County, Minnesota
Rivers of Winona County, Minnesota
Rivers of Minnesota
Southern Minnesota trout streams
Driftless Area